Stefan Tait (born 14 March 1996) is a South African cricketer. He made his List A debut for South Western Districts in the 2018–19 CSA Provincial One-Day Challenge on 28 October 2018. He made his first-class debut for South Western Districts in the 2018–19 CSA 3-Day Provincial Cup on 1 November 2018. He was the leading wicket-taker for South Western Districts in the 2018–19 CSA Provincial One-Day Challenge, with 16 dismissals in nine matches.

In April 2021, Tait was named in the South Africa Emerging Men's squad for their six-match tour of Namibia. He made his Twenty20 debut on 12 February 2022, for Warriors in the 2021–22 CSA T20 Challenge.

References

External links
 

1996 births
Living people
South African cricketers
South Western Districts cricketers
Warriors cricketers
Place of birth missing (living people)